The Dogs is a 1979 French drama film directed by Alain Jessua. It was entered into the 11th Moscow International Film Festival.
A young doctor, Doctor Henri Ferret, has just moved to the Paris region. Many of his patients consult after being bitten. He learns that, to protect themselves from nocturnal attacks, the inhabitants have bought guard dogs ... Morel, who trains the dogs, as well as some inhabitants, have an excessive love for these animals, whereas these sometimes show themselves dangerous and unpredictable, especially when a dog kills for no reason.

Cast
 Gérard Depardieu as Morel
 Victor Lanoux as Doctor Henri Ferret
 Nicole Calfan as Elisabeth
 Pierre Vernier as Gauthier
 Fanny Ardant as L'infirmière
 Philippe Klébert as Franck
 Régis Porte as Jacques
 Gérard Séty as Le maire
 Philippe Mareuil as Beauchamp
 Henri Labussière as Montagnac, le pharmacien
 Anna Gaylor as Madame Colin

References

External links
 

1979 films
1979 drama films
1970s vigilante films
French drama films
1970s French-language films
Films directed by Alain Jessua
Films about dogs
French vigilante films
1970s French films